An islet is a very small, often unnamed island. Most definitions are not precise, but some suggest that an islet has little or no vegetation and cannot support human habitation. It may be made of rock, sand and/or hard coral; may be permanent or tidal (i.e. surfaced reef or seamount); and may exist in the sea, lakes, rivers or any other sizeable bodies of water.

Definition 

As suggested by its origin islette, an Old French diminutive of "isle", use of the term implies small size, but little attention is given to drawing an upper limit on its applicability.

The World Landforms website says, "An islet landform is generally considered to be a rock or small island that has little vegetation and cannot sustain human habitation", and further that size may vary from a few square feet to several square miles, with no specific rule pertaining to size.

Other terms

  Ait  (/eɪt/, like eight) or eyot (/aɪ(ə)t, eɪt/), a small island. It is especially used to refer to river islands found on the River Thames and its tributaries in England.
  Cay  or  key, an islet formed by the accumulation of fine sand deposits atop a reef, especially in the Caribbean and West Atlantic. Rum Cay in the Bahamas and the Florida Keys off Florida are examples of islets.
 The French suffix -hou from the Scandinavian -holm, is used for the names of some islets in the Channel Islands, such as Écréhous, Burhou, Lihou and Les Houmets, and off Normandy, such as Tatihou.
 Inch, a term used especially in Scotland, from the Gaelic innis, which originally meant island, but has been supplanted to refer to smaller islands, such the islet of Inch, off St Mary's Isle Priory, Inch Kenneth, Inchkeith, Keith Inch (no longer an island) and Inchcailloch.
 Motu, a reef islet formed by broken coral and sand, surrounding an atoll, especially in Polynesia, such as Motu One, Motu Nao and Motu Paahi.
  River island, an islet within the current of a river, such as the Île de la Cité in Paris.
 A rock, in the sense of a type of islet, is an uninhabited landform composed of exposed rocks, lying offshore, and having at most minimal vegetation, such as Albino Rock in the Palm Island group off Queensland, Australia. 
  Sandbar  or shoal, an exposed sandbar.
  Sea stack, a thin, vertical landform jutting out of a body of water.
  Skerry, a small rocky island, usually defined to be too small for habitation, especially in Ireland.
  Subsidiary islets, a more technical application, is applied to small land features isolated by water, lying off the shore of a larger island. Similarly, any emergent land in an atoll is also called an islet.
  Tidal island, small islands (not always islets) which lie closely off the coast of a mainland or a much larger island, being connected to it (and thus becomes a peninsula/promontory) in low tide and isolated by a channel in high tide.

In international law 

Whether an islet is considered a rock or not, it can have significant economic consequences under Article 121 of the UN Convention on the Law of the Sea, which stipulates that "Rocks which cannot sustain human habitation or economic life of their own shall have no exclusive economic zone or continental shelf." One long-term dispute over the status of such an islet was that of Snake Island (Black Sea).

The International Court of Justice jurisprudence however sometimes ignores islets, regardless of inhabitation status, in deciding territorial disputes; it did so in 2009 in adjudicating the Romania-Ukraine dispute, and previously in the dispute between Libya and Malta involving the islet of Filfla.

List of islets 
There are thousands of islets on Earth: approximately 24,000 islands and islets in the Stockholm archipelago alone. The following is a list of example islets from around the world.

 Águila Islet, the southernmost point of The Americas
 Aplin Islet (Queensland)
 Apia
 Auster Lake Islet 
 Ball's Pyramid, South Pacific
 Bay Islet or See Chau, Hong Kong
 Bikirrin, in Majuro, Marshall Islands
 Black Rock, South Atlantic
 Boundary Islet, Australia
 Bogskär, Finland
 Briggs Islet, southeastern Australia
 Bushy Islet (Queensland)
 Capitancillo Islet, in Bogo City, Cebu, Philippines
 Chão, in the Madeira Islands, Portugal
 Cholmondeley Islet (Queensland)
 Clubes Island, Brasília, Brazil
 Columbretes Islands, Spain
 Cone Islet, southeastern Australia
 Douglas Islet (Queensland)
 Dry Tortugas, Florida Keys, USA
 Dugay Islet, southeastern Australia
 Edwards Islet, southeastern Australia
 Enekalamur in Majuro, Marshall Islands
 Enemanit in Majuro, Marshall Islands
 Fairway Rock, Bering Strait
 Fastnet Rock, Ireland
 Filfla, southern Malta
 Formigas, in the Azores islands
 Gáshólmur, Faroe Islands
 Granite Island (South Australia), Victor Harbor, South Australia.
 Galatasaray Islet, Istanbul, Turkey
 Halfway Islet, Queensland, Australia
 Herald Island, Arctic Ocean
 Île Vierge, France
 Isles of Scilly, United Kingdom
 Kid Island, Lake of the Ozarks, Missouri United States
 Islets of Caroline Island, in Kiribati
 Islets of Mauritius
 Isla de Alborán, Spain, Western Mediterranean
 Jardine Islet (Queensland)
 Jethou, Bailiwick of Guernsey
 Keelung Islet, off the northern shore of Taiwan
 Klein Bonaire, Netherlands
 Kolbeinsey, Iceland
 Liancourt Rocks, South Korea
 Lihou, Bailiwick of Guernsey
 Magra Islet (Queensland)
 Mañagaha, Saipan
 Martin Islet (New South Wales)
 Mid Woody Islet, southeastern Australia
 Milman Islet (Queensland)
 Monchique Islet, Europe's westernmost point, in the Azores, Portugal
 Noorderhaaks, off the coast of the Netherlands
 Oodaaq, Greenland
 Parece Vela, West Pacific
 Perejil Island, Strait of Gibraltar
 Penguin Islet (Tasmania)
 Pigeon Island, Sri Lanka
 Pokonji Dol, Croatia
 Velika Sestrica, Croatia
 Rockall, North Atlantic
 Saint Peter and Saint Paul rocks, equatorial Atlantic
 Salas y Gómez, Northeast from Easter Island
 Saunders Islet (Queensland)
 Seacrow Islet, southeastern Australia
 Shag Rocks, South Atlantic
 Silver Islet, Ontario
 Sinclair Islet (Queensland)
 Skull Islet, in British Columbia, Canada
 Star Keys/Motuhope, New Zealand
 Saltholm, small Islet in Oresund west of Copenhagen
 Sue Islet (Queensland)
 Sumbiarholmur, Faroe Islands
 Sunday Islet (Queensland)
 Taprobane Island, Sri Lanka
 Thomson Islet (Queensland)
 Tindhólmur, Faroe Islands
 Vilkitsky Island, Arctic Ocean
 Wallace Islet (Queensland)
 Wachusett Reef, Ernest Legouve Reef, and Maria Theresa Reef, South Pacific Ocean
 Westward Islet, in the Pitcairn Islands
 Ynys Lawd, Wales

Notes

References
 

Coastal and oceanic landforms
Coastal geography
Islands by type